Dual specificity protein phosphatase 19 is an enzyme that in humans is encoded by the DUSP19 gene.

Interactions 

DUSP19 has been shown to interact with ASK1 and MAP2K7.

References

Further reading

External links 
 

EC 3.1.3